Datacom may refer to:

 Data communication
 DATACOM/DB, a relational database for IBM mainframes
 Datacom Group, a New Zealand-based IT company
 Next Generation Data Communications (DataComm), an aviation initiative to replace some voice communications between pilots and air traffic control with textual messages